Chokh is a rural locality (a selo) and the administrative centre of Chokhsky Selsoviet, Gunibsky District, Republic of Dagestan, Russia. The population was 1,170 as of 2010. There are 2 streets.

Nationalities 
Avars live there.

Geography
Chokh is located 18 km southeast of Gunib (the district's administrative centre) by road. Obokh and Sogratl are the nearest rural localities.

References 

Rural localities in Gunibsky District